is a town located in Kanagawa Prefecture, Japan. , the town had an estimated population of 48,679 and a population density of 3600 persons per km².

Geography
Samukawa is located in the flatlands of central Kanagawa Prefecture. The Sagami River passes through the town.

Surrounding municipalities
Kanagawa Prefecture
Chigasaki
Fujisawa
Ebina
Atsugi
Hiratsuka

Climate
Samukawa has a Humid subtropical climate (Köppen Cfa) characterized by warm summers and cool winters with light to no snowfall.  The average annual temperature in Samukawa is 15.2 °C. The average annual rainfall is 1872 mm with September as the wettest month. The temperatures are highest on average in August, at around 25.6 °C, and lowest in January, at around 5.2 °C.

Demographics
Per Japanese census data, the population of Samukawa has grown steadily over the past 50 years.

History
The village of Samukawa was founded in 1889 with the establishment of the modern municipalities system. It was linked with Chigasaki Station by the Sagami Line in 1921. A spur line extending from Samukawa to the west led to development of housing and industry, increasing the population of Samukawa such that by 1940 it was granted town status. The Sagami Naval Arsenal of the Imperial Japanese Navy was located in Samukawa until the end of World War II. In 2002, a large quantity of mustard gas was found buried under its former site.

Government
Samukawa has a mayor-council form of government with a directly elected mayor and a unicameral town council of 18 members. Samukawa contributes one member to the Kanagawa Prefectural Assembly. In terms of national politics, the town is part of Kanagawa 12th district of the lower house of the Diet of Japan.

Economy
Samukawa has a mixed economy. Industry includes factories operated by Nissan Kohki, a subsidiary of Nissan Motors producing automotive engines.

Education
Samukawa has five public elementary schools and three public middle schools operated by the town government. The town has one public high school operated by the Kanagawa Prefectural Board of Education

Transportation

Railway
 JR East - Sagami Line
 -  -

Highway
 
 Kanagawa Prefectural Routes 44, 45, 46, and 47

Local attractions
Samukawa Shrine, the first shrine (ichinomiya) of former Sagami Province

References

External links

Official Website 

Towns in Kanagawa Prefecture
Samukawa